Feelin' It or Feeling It may refer to:

Music

Albums
Feelin' It (album) by Jimmy McGriff, 2011

Songs
"Feelin' It" (Jay-Z song)
"Feelin' It" (Scotty McCreery song), 2014
"Feelin' It", a song by Chuck Berry and the Steve Miller Band from the album Live at the Fillmore Auditorium, 1967